The Italian Catholic Archdiocese of Chieti-Vasto received that name in 1986. The historic Archdiocese of Chieti was elevated from a diocese in 1526.

History

Chieti is the ancient Teate. In the Gothic War it was captured by Totila; later it fell into the hands of the Lombards, from whom it was captured by Pepin and devastated. The Normans rebuilt the city, which thenceforth belonged to the Kingdom of the Two Sicilies.

Saint Justinus is venerated as the first Bishop of Chieti, and the cathedral is dedicated to him. Several of his successors are also venerated as saints, among them Gribaldus (874), whose portrait is on the bronze doors of the monastery of St. Clement in the Island of Pescara.

Giovanni Pietro Carafa in 1524 resigned the see of Chieti, and associated himself with Cajetan of Tiene in the foundation of the Theatine Order. Carafa was elected pope on 23 May 1555, and took the name Paul IV.

Bishops and Archbishops 
 Teodorico I (c. 840)
 Lupo I (c. 844)
 Pietro I (c. 853)
 Teodorico II (c. 880)
 Atinolfo (c. 904)
 Rimo (c. 962)
 Liudino (c. 965)
 Lupo II (c. 1008)
 Arnolfo (c. 1049)
 Attone I (1056–1073)
 Celso (1073–1078)
 Rainolfo (1085–1105)
 Ruggero
 Guglielmo I (1107–1117)
 Andrea I (1118)
 Gerardo (1118–1125)
 Attone II (1125–1137)
 Rustico (1137–1140)
 Alanno (1140–1150)
 Andrea II (1150–1190)
 Pietro II (1191)
 Bartolomeo (1192–1227)
 Rainaldo (1228–1234)
 Gregorio di Poli (1234–1251)
 Landolfo Caracciolo (1252–1253)
 Alessandro di Capua (1253–1262)
 Nicola da Fossa, O.Cist. (1262–1282)
 Tommaso (1282–1294) 
 Guglielmo II ? (1292–1293)
 Rainaldo, O.P. (1295–1303) 
 Mattia (1303) 
 Pietro III (1303–1320) 
 Raimondo de Mausaco, O.Min. (1324–1326)
 Giovanni Crispano de Rocca (1326–1336)
 Pietro Ferri (1336)
 Beltramino Paravicini (1336–1339)
 Guglielmo III Capoferro (1340–1352)
 Bartolomeo Papazzurri, O.P. (1353–1362)
 Vitale da Bologna, O.S.M. (1363–1373)
 Eleazario da Sabrano (1373–1378)
 Giovanni de Comina (1378–1396)
 Guglielmo Carbone (1396–1418)
 Nicola Viviani (1419–1428)
 Marino de Tocco (1429–1438)
 Giovanni Battista della Buona (1438–1445)
 Colantonio Valignani (1445–1488)
 Alfonso d'Aragona (1488–1497)
 Giacomo Bacio Terracina (1497–1499)
 Oliviero Carafa (administrator of the see, 1499–1501) 
 Bernardino Carafa (1501–1505) 
 Gian Pietro Carafa (1505–1518), then archbishop of Brindisi
 Gian Pietro Carafa (administrator of the see, 1518–1524)
 Felice Trofino (1524–1527), antibishop from 1526
 Guido de' Medici (1528–1537)
 Gian Pietro Carafa (1537–1549), then archbishop of Naples
 Bernardino Maffei (1549–1553)
 Marcantonio Maffei (1553–1568)
 Giovanni Oliva (1568–1577) 
 Girolamo Leoni (1577–1578)
 Cesare Busdragus (1578–1585) 
 Giovanni Battista Castrucci (1585–1591) 
 Orazio Sanminiato (1591–1592)
 Matteo Sanminiato (1592–1607)
 Anselmo Marzato, O.F.M.Cap. (1607–1607)
 Orazio Maffei (1607–1609) 
 Ulpiano Volpi (1609–1615)
 Paolo Tolosa, C.R. (1616–1618)
 Marsilio Peruzzi (1618–1631) 
 Antonio Santacroce (1631–1638), then archbishop of Urbino
 Stefano Sauli (1638–1649)
 Vincenzo Rabatta (1649–1654)
 Angelo Maria Ciria, O.S.M. (1654–1656)
 Modesto Gavazzi, O.F.M.Conv. (1657)
 Niccolò Radulovich (1659–1702)
 Vincenzo Capece (1703–1722)
 Filippo Valignani, O.P. (1722–1737) 
 Michele Palma (1737–1755)
 Nicola Sanchez De Luna (1755–1764), then bishop of Nola
 Francesco Brancia (1765–1770)
 Luigi del Giudice, O.S.B.Coel. (1770–1792)
 Andrea Mirelli, O.S.B.Coel. (1792–1795) 
 Francesco Saverio Bassi, O.S.B.Coel. (1796–1821) 
 Carlo Maria Cernelli (1822–1838)
 Giosuè Maria Saggese, C.SS.R. (1838–1852)
 Michele Manzo (1852–1856)
 Luigi Maria de Marinis (1856–1877)
 Fulco Luigi Ruffo-Scilla (1877–1887) 
 Rocco Cocchia, O.F.M. Cap. (1887–1901)  
 Gennaro Costagliola, C.M. (1901–1919) 
 Nicola Monterisi (1919–1929), then archbishop of Salerno 
 Giuseppe Venturi (1931–1947) 
 Giovanni Battista Bosio (1948–1967)  
 Loris Francesco Capovilla (1967–1971)  
 Vincenzo Fagiolo (1971–1984) 
 Antonio Valentini (1984–1993) 
 Edoardo Menichelli  (1994–2004), then archbishop of Ancona-Osimo
 Bruno Forte (from 2004)

Notes

External links
Source

Chieti
Chieti
 
Chieti